Geeste is a municipality in the district Emsland in Lower Saxony.

Situation of the local parts in the municipality of Geeste:

References

External links
Official website (German)

Emsland